Julia Mierzyńska (1801 – 1831), was a Polish ballet dancer. She belonged to the more well known ballet dancers in Poland during her career.

She was engaged in the Ballet at the National Theatre, Warsaw between 1815 and 1826.

References 

 Źródło: Słownik Biograficzny Teatru Polskiego 1765-1965, PWN Warszawa 1973

1801 births
19th-century Polish ballet dancers
1831 deaths